The 2016 Pure Michigan 400 was a NASCAR Sprint Cup Series stock car race held on August 28, 2016, at Michigan International Speedway in Brooklyn, Michigan. Contested over 200 laps on the  D-shaped oval, it was the 24th race of the 2016 NASCAR Sprint Cup Series season.

Kyle Larson won his first career Cup Series race, the race had thirteen lead changes among different drivers and four cautions for
17 laps.

Report

Background

The track is used primarily for NASCAR events. It is sometimes known as a "sister track" to Texas World Speedway, and was used as the basis of Auto Club Speedway. The track is owned by International Speedway Corporation (ISC). Michigan International Speedway is recognized as one of motorsports' premier facilities because of its wide racing surface and high banking (by open-wheel standards; the 18-degree banking is modest by stock car standards).

Aero package
NASCAR announced in late July that the modified aerodynamic package used at Michigan in June and Kentucky in July was used one more time this past weekend at Michigan.

Entry list
The preliminary entry list for the race included 40 cars and was released on August 22, 2016, at 3:36 p.m. Eastern time. Alex Bowman drove in place of Dale Earnhardt Jr. this weekend as he recovers from a concussion.

First practice

Qualifying

Logano said afterwards that he was "excited (about the pole). I thought our car was really good in race trim earlier. … In qualifying trim, I didn’t think we would make it happen today, but on the last run, Todd Gordon (crew chief) made some good adjustments and gave me a pep talk, and game on. I was ready to go. I was going to drive the heck out of it and hope for the best. Once you get into the last round (of qualifying) and you are eighth on the board, what is the difference between eighth and 12th? You might as well hammer down.” He also added that Michigan "is very unique. For one, you're going 220 mph. That's freaking insane. But it's a lot of fun."

"It was just an awesome day for this Lowe's race car and this Lowe's race team," Jimmie Johnson said after qualifying second. "We keep stacking pennies and making this car better and better. My hat's off to everyone at Hendrick Motorsports and all the hard work they're putting into things. Great practice and great qualifying. We need some more practice sessions (Saturday) and roll them into a good race."

Qualifying results

Practice (post-qualifying)

Second practice

Final practice

Race

First half
Under mostly cloudy Michigan skies, Joey Logano led the field to the green flag at 2:18 p.m. The field started to string out after five laps as is typical at a track like Michigan. Chris Buescher reported engine issues early on that turned out to be a broken spark plug. He said after the race that he knew "it isn’t fun opening a hood of a race car that is as hot as it is and trying to work on it. Kudos to my guys for keeping their heads down and working at it and getting it fixed. Usually when you have engine trouble you are along for the ride. It ended up being something a little more simple than I guess we originally figured. We got back up and running and made some laps, and made a really terrible day into just an okay day. We will have to get it back at the shop and tear it down and take a look at it — and diagnose from there to see if it was a freak accident or something we need to look at going forward.” The first caution of the race flew on lap 21. It was a scheduled competition caution for overnight rain. Regan Smith opted not to pit and assumed the race lead. He pitted the next lap and handed the lead back to Logano. Brian Scott was tagged for his crew being over the wall too soon and restarted the race from the tail end of the field.

The race restarted on lap 25. Kevin Harvick took the lead from Logano going into turn 1. The second caution of the race flew the same lap for a single-car spin. Exiting turn 4, Kyle Busch got loose and spun out.

The race restarted on lap 30. By lap 39, Alex Bowman – who was subbing for Dale Earnhardt Jr. – fell from sixth to out of the top-10 in what was later determined to be an ignition issue. Denny Hamlin radioed in electrical issues, but these subsided after a while. Martin Truex Jr. powered by Harvick on the frontstretch to take the lead on lap 59. Ryan Blaney hit pit road on lap 63 and triggered a rush of green flag pit stops. Truex pitted from the lead a lap later and handed the lead to Harvick. Truex lost time on pit road after his car fell off the jack. Harvick pitted from the lead on lap 67 and handed the lead to Brad Keselowski. He pitted on lap 71 and the lead cycled to Jimmie Johnson.

The routine of strung-out racing was the norm for the next 36 laps until Blaney kicked off the next round of green flag stops on lap 107. Johnson pitted the next lap and handed the lead to Chase Elliott. He pitted the next lap and handed the lead to Keselowski. He would stay out for another eight laps before pitting on lap 117 and the lead cycled to Elliott before debris brought out the third caution of the race on lap 118.

Second half

The race restarted on lap 126. Kyle Larson beat Elliott going into turn 1 to take the lead. After that, the field settled into place until Logano kicked off the final round of green flag stops with 47 laps to go. Larson pitted from the lead, along with Elliott, with 44 laps to go and handed the lead to Keselowski. Elliott beat Larson off pit road, which allowed him to take the lead when the pit stop cycle concluded. Keselowski pitted the next lap and handed the lead to Matt Kenseth. He pitted with 35 laps to go and handed the lead to Ryan Newman. He pitted with 33 laps to go and handed the lead to Greg Biffle. He pitted with 32 laps to go and the lead cycled to Elliott. During the pit cycle, Aric Almirola was black-flagged for an uncontrolled tire and was forced to serve a pass through penalty.

A tire carcass that came off the No. 46 of Michael Annett brought out the fourth caution of the race with 13 laps to go.

The race restarted with nine laps to go. Larson was pushed to the lead by Keselowski and drove on to score the victory.

Post-race

Driver comments
Larson said in victory lane that his team has "worked hard to get a win, and we just haven't done it Finally, all the hard work by everybody, the hundreds of people at our race shop, people who have gotten me to the Cup Series all paid off. I couldn't quite catch my breath there after I got out of the car because I spent two minutes screaming. I was so pumped up. It was pretty special, and I will remember it forever. I have been close a few times in my career and to get it before my 100th career start next week is pretty awesome." He also took time to dedicate the victory to his friend, the late Bryan Clauson, saying "This one is for the Clauson family. We really miss Bryan. We love you guys. We’re going to miss him. We parked it for him, so that’s really cool."

Following a runner-up finish, Elliott said he "made another mistake. Had two opportunities to get out front there and kind of control the race and let Kyle get a better start on me. I spun the tires and didn’t do my job right. It’s about as simple as that. When your tires are spinning, you aren’t going forward. It’s definitely unfortunate. I hate to let my guys down like that. They bailed me out a few times today, and I gave it right back.’’

All in all, a lot to be proud of,” Keselowski said of his third-place finish. “Seems like every time we come here, we want to win so bad, we run third or fourth every time, which is really good in the Sprint Cup Series, but it is certainly not the win we’ve been looking for. I think this package is pretty strong. I like it a lot, personally. It’s not perfect, that’s for sure. There’s a lot of stuff to still work on. I think it’s a smaller improvement in showcasing driver talent to win races.”

Penalties
On the Wednesday following the race, the No. 2 team was issued a P2 penalty for failing post-race technical inspection. As a result, Keselowski and Paul Wolfe were fined $15,000, and Keselowski was docked 10 points.

Race results

Race summary
 Lead changes: 13 among different drivers
 Cautions/Laps: 4 for 17
 Red flags: 0
 Time of race: 2 hours, 27 minutes and 29 seconds
 Average speed:

Media

Television
NBC Sports covered the race on the television side. Rick Allen, Jeff Burton and Steve Letarte had the call in the booth for the race. Dave Burns, Mike Massaro, Marty Snider and Kelli Stavast reported from pit lane during the race.

Radio
The Motor Racing Network had the radio call for the race, which was simulcast on Sirius XM NASCAR Radio.

Standings after the race

Note: Only the first 16 positions are included for the driver standings.. – Driver has clinched a position in the Chase for the Sprint Cup.

References

2016 in sports in Michigan
2016 NASCAR Sprint Cup Series
August 2016 sports events in the United States
NASCAR races at Michigan International Speedway